John Sherwood may refer to:

 John Sherwood (athlete) (born 1945), British hurdler
 John Sherwood (author) (1913–2002), author of fiction
 John Sherwood (bishop) (died 1494), Bishop of Durham, diplomat
 John Sherwood (chemist) (died 2020), British physical chemist
 John Sherwood (comic creator), see Les Pretend
 John Sherwood (director) (1903–1959), American director of The Monolith Monsters
 John D. Sherwood (1818–1891), American author
 John Darrell Sherwood (born 1966), American author

See also 
 John Sherwood-Kelly (1880–1931), officer, recipient of the Victoria Cross